PsyArXiv is a preprint repository for the psychological sciences opened in September 2016 and officially launched in December 2016. It is hosted by the Center for Open Science. The preprint service was inspired by the arXiv repository. The service allows researchers to upload manuscripts regarding psychology and related fields prior to peer review. As of April 2017, it is indexed by Google Scholar.

Fields
PsyArXiv accepted submissions in the following areas of research:

See also 
 List of preprint repositories

References

External links

Eprint archives
Open-access archives
American digital libraries
Works about psychology
Online archives of the United States